Špansko is a neighbourhood in the western part of Zagreb. It has about 24,000 inhabitants.  It belongs to Stenjevec district.

Špansko is divided into two parts (two independent local councils) – Špansko-sjever (Špansko North) and Špansko-jug (Špansko South) – by Antun Šoljan Street.

There are two Catholic parishes in Špansko: parish of Blessed Virgin Mary and Ivan Merz.

Postal code of the neighbourhood is 10090.

Etymology 
The name Špansko derives from the word špan, that in Duchy of Pannonian Croatia and later during the Croatian history (especially of the medieval period) noted nobleman's or municipal (općina's) tax-collector among serfs. Word is of Croatian origin (župan > žpan), but was modified by both Hungarian (ispan) and Croatian language (ispan > span > špan). Špansko is administrative area of a certain špan, his tax-collecting area.

The first known toponym of Špansko is Lonka (1242), which was later modified into Lonka Superior ("Upper Lonka", 1346). The first mention of the "Špansko" is Lwka Špani toponym from the year of 1598.

Population 

Tituš Brezovački Elementary school has the greatest number of pupils in Zagreb.

Culture 
Špansko is known as a "neighbourhood of Croatian poets and warriors" due to its street naming, dominantly by poets and writers (Dragutin Domjanić, Josip Pupačić, Vid Došen, Antun Šoljan, Drago Gervais), as well as Croatian brigades from Homeland War. Špansko has three elementary schools (Ante Kovačić, Tituš Brezovački and Špansko Oranice Elementary school), two of which are named by noted Croatian writers. Central square in the neighbourhood is named after Ivan Kukuljević Sakcinski with the Park of the Croatian volunteers (defenders) of the Homeland War.

Ivanka Brađašević worked as a librarian in the Ante Kovačić Elementary school.

There are two public libraries, each in the one of the two local councils.

Sport 
Špansko is famous for its football club NK Špansko, which was very successful in the 1980s and 1990s.

Famous Croatian female handball player Klaudija Bubalo attended Ante Kovačić Elementary school, where she started playing handball at physical education classes. Vedran Zrnić attended the same school as well.

References

Literature 
 Alajbeg, Trpimir (2015): 40 godina Župe Blažene Djevice Marije Žalosne Špansko, Denona, Zagreb. .
 Čondić, Vesna (2004): Sjećanja učitelja i bivših učenika: Klaudija Bubalo, in: Španček - ljetopis OŠ Ante Kovačića (Španćek - yearbook of Ante Kovačić Elementary school), Školska knjiga, Zagreb 2004.

Neighbourhoods of Zagreb